Polyonychia also known as supernumerary nails is a condition in which two or more nails grow in the same finger or toe.

Signs and symptoms 

The signs/symptoms of polyonychia are very easy to detect: two or more nails growing on the same finger or toe.

The nails can either be separate, small nails (micronychia) or one wide, almost complete nail, the digit affected could also be wider than normal

Causes 
Polyonychia is generally caused by a congenital duplication of the distal phalange of the affected digit(s), this can be caused by congenital factors (sporadic without a genetic link) or by genetic factors (sporadic or familial with genetic link).

It can also be caused by polysyndactyly, which is characterized as one normal digit being connected/webbed (syndactyly) to an extra digit (polydactyly).

Polyonychia can also be acquired, such as after an accident that affected the nail bed causing it to split. This type of polyonychia is just referred to as "post-traumatic split nail" 

Polyonychia's syndromic causes include:

Isolated congenital onychodysplasia

Polyonychia's non-syndromic causes include:

Polyphalangism (more specifically of the distal phalange)
Polysyndactyly

See also 
Polydactyly
Syndactyly
Polysyndactyly

References

Nail anatomy